Bruno Pasquini (23 November 1914 – 12 August 1995) was an Italian racing cyclist. He rode in the 1948 and 1949 Tour de France.

References

External links
 

1914 births
1995 deaths
Italian male cyclists
Sportspeople from the Province of Pistoia
Cyclists from Tuscany